Tris(trifluoropropyl)trimethylcyclotrisiloxane (D3F) is a chemical substance. It is a derivative of hexamethylcyclotrisiloxane (D3), but also belongs to the class of per- and polyfluoroalkyl substances (PFASs).

It occurs in two diastereomeric forms:

D3F is used to produce polymethyltrifluoropropylsiloxane (PMTFPS). The starting material is dichloromethyl(3,3,3-trifluoropropyl)silane. Tetrakis(trifluoropropyl)tetramethylcyclotetrasiloxane (D4F) is produced as a reaction by-product.

It has been detected in wastewater, sewage sludge as well as in biosolid-amended soils.

References 

Trifluoromethyl compounds
Siloxanes